KBF may refer to:

 Kakauhua language, ISO 639-3 language code kbf
 Kelvin body force, a force on a fluid in a magnetic field
 King Baudouin Foundation, a Belgian organisation
 Kirkby-in-Furness railway station, England, National Rail station code KBF
 Knott's Berry Farm, an amusement park in California